The 1996 Genting Malaysian Masters was an invitational non-ranking snooker tournament, which took place between 20 and 23 May 1996 at the Genting Highlands in Pahang, Malaysia. Dominic Dale won the tournament defeating Drew Henry 8–3 in the final.

Results

References

Malaysian Masters (snooker)
1996 in snooker
1996 in Malaysian sport